Renova is an unincorporated community in Dexter Township, Mower County, Minnesota, United States.

Renova was platted in 1900. The Renova post office closed in 1934.

Notes

Unincorporated communities in Mower County, Minnesota
Unincorporated communities in Minnesota